Needmore is an unincorporated community in Ste. Genevieve County 63627 , in the U.S. state of Missouri.

Post office is in Bloomsdale, MO
The community was named for a local store of the same name which was said to need more of everything.

References

Unincorporated communities in Cedar County, Missouri
Unincorporated communities in Missouri